São Tomé Island, at , is the largest island of São Tomé and Príncipe and is home in May 2018 to about 193,380 or 96% of the nation's population.  The island is divided into six districts. It is located 2 km (1¼ miles) north of the equator.

Geography

The island is surrounded by a number of small islands, including Ilhéu das Rolas, Ilhéu das Cabras and Ilhéu Gabado.

Languages
The main language is Portuguese, but there are many speakers of Forro and Angolar (Ngola), two Portuguese-based creole languages. The name "Sao Tome" is Portuguese for "Saint Thomas."

Geology
It formed along the Cameroon line, a line of volcanoes extending from Cameroon southwest into the Atlantic Ocean. Most of the lava erupted on São Tomé over the last million years has been basalt. The youngest dated rock on the island is about 100,000 years old, but numerous more recent cinder cones are found on the southeast side of the island.

Environment and economy
The higher slopes of the island are forested and form part of the Parque Natural Obô de São Tomé, but agriculture is important near the north and east coasts.  The chief exports are cocoa, coffee, copra, and palm products, while there is also a fishing industry.

Large reserves of oil are in the ocean between Nigeria and São Tomé. The discovery has been lamented by some as endangering the nation's political stability and natural environment. In response to these concerns the government of São Tomé and Príncipe has drawn up legislation in an attempt to ensure the efficient and equitable use of oil revenues over time.

Natural history

Birds
The island has a total of 63 regular bird species, plus an additional 36 vagrant and unconfirmed species. Of these, 19 are endemic and 3 near endemic; in addition, the local subspecies of olive ibis (Bostrychia olivacea bocagei) and maroon pigeon (Columba thomensis) are endemic and considered critically endangered. Six species are considered vulnerable, and two critically endangered (São Tomé fiscal and São Tomé grosbeak).

Administrative divisions

São Tomé is divided into the following six districts (seat within brackets):
Água Grande (São Tomé)
Cantagalo (Santana)
Caué (São João dos Angolares)
Lembá (Neves)
Lobata (Guadalupe)
Mé-Zóchi (Trindade)

Towns and villages
Villages on the island include:

 Agua-Coco
 Agua Ize
 Alice
 Alto Douro
 Andrade
 Bela Vista
 Blublu
 Bom Successo
 Buenos Aires
 Dona Augusta
 Dona Eugenia
 Enjale
 Formiga
 General Fonseco
 Graça
 Granja
 Guadalupe
 Guegue Norte
 Henrique
 Java
 Lemos
 Mbombo
 Mbondi
 Monte Café
 Monte Herminios
 Monte Rosa
 Neves
 Nova Olinda
 Nzumbi
 Plato Café
 Ponta Figo
 Portinho
 Porto Alegre
 Preserverança
 Quimpo
 Ribeira Afonso
 Santa Catarina
 Santa Clotilde
 Santa Cruz
 Santa Josefina
 Santana
 Santo António
 São João dos Angolares
 São José
 São Tomé
 Saudade
 Trindade
 Ubabundo

References 

 
 CIA Word Fact Book

 
Islands of São Tomé and Príncipe
Volcanoes of the Atlantic Ocean
Polygenetic shield volcanoes